Telve di Sopra (Tèlve de Sóra in local dialect) is a comune (municipality) in Trentino in the northern Italian region Trentino-Alto Adige/Südtirol, located about  east of Trento.

Telve di Sopra borders the following municipalities: Telve, Palù del Fersina, Torcegno and Borgo Valsugana.

Demographic evolution

References

Cities and towns in Trentino-Alto Adige/Südtirol